The counts of Albon were members of the medieval nobility in what is now south-eastern France.

Guigues IV, Count of Albon (d. 1142) was nicknamed  or 'the Dolphin'. His nickname morphed into a title among his successors. By 1293, the lands ruled by the Counts Albon, the old , were known as the Dauphiné of Viennois.

The titles and lands had been part of the Holy Roman Empire since 1032. They passed to Philip VI of France in 1349 on condition that the heir apparent to the French crown always be titled , and be personal holder of the lands and titles.  By condition of the emperor, the Dauphiny could never be united to France.  When the king of France had no son, he would personally rule the Dauphiny separately, as dauphin. Thus, the province technically remained in the Holy Roman Empire even after 1349, and it was administered separately from France well into the early modern period; it was incorporated into France only de facto with the rise of absolutism in the 17th century.

Lords of Château d'Albon

House of Albon

 Guigues I of Albon the Old (c. 1000–1070), Count in Oisans, Grésivaudan and Briançonnais, Lord of Château d'Albon, ruled until 1070
 Guigues II of Albon the Fat (c. 1020–1079), Count in Grésivaudan and Briançonnais, Lord of Château d'Albon, ruled 1070–1079

Counts of Albon

House of Albon

 Guigues III of Albon the Count (c. 1050–1133), first Count of Albon (the southern part of the ancient County of Vienne; the northern part was granted to the first Count of Savoy), ruled 1079–1133
 Guigues IV of Albon, le Dauphin (c. 1095–1142), Count of Albon, ruled 1133–1142

Counts of Albon and Dauphins of Viennois
 Robert V, Count of Auvergne married Marquise d'Albon, a daughter of Guigues IV. Their descendants adopted the title of Dauphin of Auvergne, and it was used by some as the family name.

House of Albon

 Guigues V of Albon (c. 1120–1162), Count of Albon and Grenoble, Dauphin of Viennois,  ruled 1142–1162
 Béatrice of Albon (1161–1228), Dauphine of Viennois, Countess of Albon, Grenoble, Oisans et Briançon, ruled 1162–1228, married Hugh III of Burgundy

House of Burgundy

 Guigues VI of Viennois (1184–1237), Dauphin de Viennois, count of Albon, Grenoble, Oisans and Briançon, ruled 1228–1237
 Guigues VII of Viennois (c. 1225–1269), Dauphin of Viennois, Count of Albon, Grenoble, Oisans, Briançon, Embrun and Gap, son of, ruled 1237–1269
 John I of Viennois (1263–1282), Dauphin of Viennois, Count of Albon, Grenoble, Oisans, Briançon and Embrun, ruled 1269–1282
 Anne of Viennois (1255–1298), Dauphine of Viennois, Countess of Albon, married Humbert, Baron of La Tour du Pin

House of La Tour du Pin

 Humbert I of Viennois (c. 1240–1307), Baron of La Tour du Pin, Dauphin of Viennois and Count of Albon, ruled 1282–1307
 John II of Viennois (1280–1318), Baron of La Tour du Pin, Dauphin of Viennois, ruled 1307–1318
 Guigues VIII of Viennois (1309–1333), Dauphin of Viennois, ruled 1318–1333
 Humbert II of Viennois (1312–1355), Dauphin of Viennois, ruled 1333–1349

Humbert II sold his lands and titles to Philip VI of France.

Dauphins of Viennois and Dauphins of France

House of Valois

 Charles I of Viennois (1338–1380), also king of France as Charles V, Dauphin of Viennois, Count of Diois and Valentinois, Duke of Normandy, ruled the dauphinate as the first Dauphin of France (1350–1364) and ruled the dauphinate as king of France (1364–1368)
 Charles II of Viennois (1368–1422), also king of France as Charles VI, Dauphin of Viennois, Count of Diois and Valentinois, ruled the dauphinate as second Dauphin of France (1368–1380), ruled the dauphinate as king of France (1380–1386) and again during (1386–1392)
Charles III of Viennois (1386), Dauphin of Viennois, Count of Diois and Valentinois, ruled the dauphinate as third Dauphin of France (1386)
 Charles IV of Viennois (1392-1401), Dauphin of Viennois, Count of Diois and Valentinois, Duke of Guyenne, ruled the dauphinate as fourth Dauphin of France (1392–1401)
 Louis I of Viennois (1397–1415), Dauphin of Viennois, Count of Diois and Valentinois, Duke of Guyenne, ruled the dauphinate as fifth Dauphin of France (1401–1415)
 John III of Viennois (1398–1417), Dauphin of Viennois, Count of Diois and Valentinois, Duke of Touraine, ruled the dauphinate as sixth Dauphin of France (1415–1417)
 Charles V of Viennois (1403–1461), also king of France as Charles VII, Dauphin of Viennois, Count of Diois, Valentinois and Ponthieu, ruled the dauphinate as seventh Dauphin of France (1417–1422), ruled the dauphinate as king of France (1422–1423, de facto 1457-1461)
 Louis II of Viennois (1423–1483), also king of France as Louis XI, Dauphin of Viennois, Count of Diois and Valentinois, ruled the dauphinate as eighth Dauphin of France (1423–1461), ruled the dauphinate as king of France (1461–1466)

See also 
 Dauphins of France
 Dauphins of Auvergne

Notes

 
 
Viennois
Albon